Capitol View Manor is a small community in Southwest Atlanta that was named for the excellent view of the Georgia State Capitol building. Its boundaries include I-75/85 to the east, the Beltline to the north, Metropolitan Parkway to the west, and Atlanta Technical College to the south.

History

Early history
Capitol View Manor was originally vast farmland owned by a select group of people that included John Shannon and the Deckner Family. During the early 1910s, many people started to settle in the area, and, in 1912, the area known as Capitol View was annexed to the City of Atlanta. This is when many utilities, including sewage and electricity, came to the area. In 1920, Capitol View Manor was established, and more houses started to be built on the eastern side of Stewart Avenue. Five years later, Capitol View Manor was annexed to the City of Atlanta. Most of the homes in this neighborhood were built in the next twenty years. In addition, the Capitol View School was built in 1929.

Decline

During the mid-20th century, Interstate 75-85 cut through the land to the east of the neighborhood, separating Capitol View Manor to what is now known as High Pointe Estates, cutting Manford Road in two pieces, and destroying the intersection of Hillside and Deckner in the southeast corner of the neighborhood. In this timeframe, "white flight" occurred in the neighborhood. Few stayed, and the neighborhood fell into decline.

Renewal
In the late 1990s Stewart Avenue was renamed Metropolitan Parkway so the street wouldn't be referred to as a red-light district. Since then, many efforts have been made to revive the area: more retail is coming to the area, the Beltline Tax Allocation District, and home sales are rising. The Pittsburgh Yards project located across the Southside Beltline trail from CVM also promises to be an economic catalyst for the area bringing new jobs, opportunities for small businesses, community engagement, and green space.

Housing
Most of the homes in Capitol View Manor were built between the early 1920s and the mid-1940s. Earlier home styles include Bungalows, Victorians, Cape Cods, and Colonials. Most of the later homes were ranches. Capitol View Manor was originally developed by the same developer of the Morningside and Virginia Highland neighborhood. The rolling streets are a calming contrast to the street-car grid neighborhoods neighboring CVM. Homes in the neighborhood are some of the most affordable within the city limits for their uniqueness and quality; they range from $300,000 - $550,000.

Parks and recreation

Capitol View Manor is close to many recreational amenities, including the  Millican Park, the  Perkerson Park, the  Hillside Park, and the Carver Family YMCA.

Emma Millican Park is the largest available greenspace in the neighborhood. It is at the western stub of Deckner Ave. and offers a playground, shaded walking trails, a pavilion, open green-space and creek. In 2005, Emma Millican Park was chosen to undergo the Park Pride Visioning Process, in which the neighbors of the community came up with a master plan for their neighborhood park. In addition, the Dill Triangle Park is often used as a garden and a gathering place and is decorated for the holidays every December by the neighborhood association.

Landmarks

Capitol View Manor is home to Liberty International Church and the former 80-year-old Capitol View Baptist Church was demolished in 2014 to make way for the Metropolitan Branch Library. Attempts to remodel the church as the new library were cost prohibitive but neighbors were able to get the marble columns and stained glass windows saved to be repurposed at the new library. The 102-year-old Deckner house (which was the residence of the Deckner Family), Fire Station 20, Advance Auto Parts, and the yellow-brick Postal Union building are also neighborhood landmarks. The Southside trail of the Beltline also spans the entire northern boundary along Erin Ave.

Education

The schools for the neighborhood are:
Elementary-Perkerson Elementary School
Middle-Sylvan Middle School
High-Carver High School

In addition, the Atlanta Technical College and the Atlanta Metropolitan College are due south of the neighborhood.

Metropolitan Library

The Atlanta–Fulton Public Library System opened the Metropolitan Branch Library located at 1332 Metropolitan Parkway, Atlanta, GA 30310 on October 1, 2015. The library now serves as the polling location for CVM and several surrounding neighborhoods and is a hub for community engagement.

References

External links
Capitol View Manor Neighborhood Facebook Page
Larry Felton Johnson's Blog about CVM
Map of Capitol View Manor from Wikimapia

Neighborhoods in Atlanta
National Register of Historic Places in Atlanta